Justin Leo Thomas Frishberg (born 17 March 1972) is a male former British wheelchair rugby player.

Personal life
Frishberg was educated at Abingdon School from 1985 until 1990 where he was a keen rugby and tennis player. He then studied at Balliol College, Oxford.

Wheelchair rugby career
Frishberg was part of the Great Britain team at the 2004 Paralympics in Athens, and at the 2008 Paralympics in Beijing. The team came in fourth place both times just failing to secure a bronze medal on both occasions after losing out to the United States and Canada respectively.

He was appointed Assistant Coach to the British wheelchair rugby team in 2013, a position he held until the start of 2017.

See also
 List of Old Abingdonians

References

External links
 

1972 births
Living people
Paralympic wheelchair rugby players of Great Britain
Wheelchair rugby players at the 2004 Summer Paralympics
Wheelchair rugby players at the 2008 Summer Paralympics
Alumni of Balliol College, Oxford
People educated at Abingdon School